Roy Goldstein (born 20 June 1993 in Misgav) is an Israeli former professional cyclist, who competed professionally for the  team between 2015 and 2019.

Major results
2012
 2nd Road race, National Road Championships
2014
 3rd Road race, National Road Championships
2015
 3rd Road race, National Road Championships
2016
 3rd Road race, National Road Championships
2017
 1st  Road race, National Road Championships
2018
 1st  Road race, National Road Championships

References

External links

1993 births
Living people
Israeli male cyclists
European Games competitors for Israel
Cyclists at the 2019 European Games